This is a list of seasons of the National Rugby League, including its predecessors in the New South Wales Rugby League, Australian Rugby League and Super League.

See also 

 Australian rugby league premiers
 Super League war

References 

 
National Rugby League lists